The men's team time trial cycling event at the 1932 Olympic Games took place on August 4.  It was competed in a 100 km time trial format.  Team time taken as sum of the team's three best finishers.

Results

Final

References

Road cycling at the 1932 Summer Olympics
Cycling at the Summer Olympics – Men's team time trial